Vilandhai is a village nearer to Andimadam in the Ariyalur district of Tamil Nadu, India. Vilandhai is divided into Vilandhai-North and Vilandhai-South.

Etymology 
The Bilva trees were surrounding the Lord Agatheswarar temple, so the place was called Vilandhai.
வில்வ மரங்கள் அடர்ந்த காடு "விளத்தை" என பெயர் பெற்றது

Demographics 
As per the 2001 census, Vilandhai-South had a total population of 9663 with 4855 males and 4808 females, while Vilandhai-North had a total population of 2012 with 1009 males and 1003 females. 

The main occupation of the residents is weaving.

Reference

Villages in Ariyalur district